= Rudolph, Holy Roman Emperor =

Rudolph, Holy Roman Emperor may refer to:

- Rudolf I of Germany (1218–1291), King of the Romans
- Rudolf II, Holy Roman Emperor (1552–1612), Holy Roman Emperor, King of Hungary, King of Bohemia and Archduke of Austria
